Arccos, ArcCos, ARCCOS, arccos, or ARccOS may refer to:

arccos (trigonometry), the inverse trigonometric function of cosine
ARccOS protection, a copyright protection mechanism by Sony